The 2020–21 season was the 66th season of TRAU FC in existence and second season in the I-League. The club finished their second I-League season at the 3rd position with 26 points.

Trau FC's top goal scorer was Bidyashagar Singh with 12 goals from 15 matches.

Squad

 
(Captain) 
(Vice Captain)

Current technical staff 
As of 15 March 2020.

Competitions

I-League

League table

League Results by round

League Matchdays

Championship Stage (Group A)

References

TRAU
TRAU FC seasons